Tashkurgan Khunjerab Airport is an airport in Xinjiang province, China. It opened on December 23, 2022. At an elevation of 3,200 m, it is Xinjiang's first high plateau airport.
The airport has been designed to handle 400 tons and 160,000 passengers annually. Test flights were started at the airport in May 2022.

The airport is seen to be part of a larger effort to develop the region commercially and to support the land route, a part of the China–Pakistan Economic Corridor, and the larger Belt and Road Initiative. It is also seen as a larger part of China's border infrastructure improvement and its 14th Five Year Plan.

Airlines and destinations

References 

2022 establishments in China
Airports in Xinjiang
Tashkurgan Tajik Autonomous County
Airports established in 2022